John Denning Robins (17 May 1926 – 21 February 2007), was a Welsh international rugby union player who attained 11 caps for Wales between 1950 and 1953. A prop, he toured New Zealand and Australia with the British and Irish Lions in 1950 and became the first Lions coach, on the 1966 British Lions tour to Australia and New Zealand.

Robins was born in Cardiff.  He was educated at Llandaff Cathedral School and Wellington School.  He joined the Royal Navy and served in World War II.  He played for England in two wartime Services Internationals.  He trained as a teacher at Loughborough and returned there as a lecturer before taking up the post of Director of Physical Education and Recreation at Sheffield University and subsequently the same position at University College, Cardiff.

Robins played for Leicester Tigers and was a noted goal-kicker despite being a prop.

References

1926 births
2007 deaths
Rugby union players from Cardiff
British & Irish Lions rugby union players from Wales
Alumni of Loughborough University
Welsh rugby union coaches
Wales international rugby union players
London Welsh RFC players
British & Irish Lions coaches
Loughborough Students RUFC players
Combined Services rugby union players
People educated at Wellington School, Somerset
Royal Navy personnel of World War II
People educated at The Cathedral School, Llandaff
Leicester Tigers players